Amalda albocallosa is a species of sea snail, a marine gastropod mollusk in the family Ancillariidae.

Description

Distribution
This marine species occurs in the Indo-Pacific

References

albocallosa
Gastropods described in 1873